Rigati may refer to pasta with ridges or grooves, including:

Cavatappi
Spaghetti rigati
Rigatoni